Watermillock is a village and former civil parish, now in the parish of Matterdale, on the western shore of Ullswater, in the English Lake District, Cumbria. In 1931 the civil parish had a population of 448. On 1 April 1934 the civil parish was merged into Matterdale.

The settlement is popular with tourists, with several campsites and two hotels. The village and outlying farms are widely scattered between the lake and Little Mell Fell. Much of the high ground around the village was once deer forest, popular with the local gentry for hunting. All Saints Church, Watermillock was built in 1881 of slate and red sandstone, replacing an earlier church at the site of what is now known as the Old Church Hotel. All the windows are memorials to various people, including Cecil Spring Rice and Stephen Spring Rice, who grew up in the village.

The village is accessed by the A592 road. The Outward Bound Trust own the village manor next to the lake. The waterfall of Aira Force is situated to the west of the village.

See also

Listed buildings in Matterdale

References

External links
 Cumbria County History Trust: Watermillock (nb: provisional research only – see Talk page)

Villages in Cumbria
Former civil parishes in Cumbria
Eden District